Buzbury Rings is an Iron Age hillfort about  east of Blandford Forum and  northwest of the village of Tarrant Keyneston, in Dorset, England.

It is a Scheduled Ancient Monument.

Description
The site is on a hill on Keynston Down.

It is bounded in the north and west by a single bank, width  and height ; an outer ditch, now buried, has been revealed by partial excavation. There are traces of additional earthworks to the south.

The B3082 road runs north-west to south-east through the site; the north-east part of the inner bank has been erased by the road, and near the road there are other breaks in the inner bank caused by later tracks. The north-east part of the outer enclosure, opposite the road from the rest of the site, is within Ashley Wood golf course.

In the inner enclosure are roughly circular depressions of diameter , probably the sites of buildings. Objects and occupation debris, from the Iron Age to the late Roman period, have been found over time, mostly in the inner enclosure.

As a result of geophysical and lidar surveys of 2006, it is thought that the site's earliest remains are of a Neolithic causewayed enclosure, and that the site continued in use from that time into the later periods.

See also
 Hillforts in Britain

References

Hill forts in Dorset
Scheduled monuments in Dorset